The Raffle is a 1991 Italian comedy-drama film written and directed by Francesco Laudadio. It marked the film debut of Monica Bellucci.

Plot
In Bari, Italy, Francesca, a beautiful and wealthy woman, is widowed and left with her daughter Giulia, and a pile of debts incurred by her husband Maurizio, whose betrayals she also discovers. On the advice of her friend Cesare, who is also a lawyer, Francesca sells off her villa by the sea, furniture, furs and jewelry, as well as a boat (which Cesare buys), to pay for at least one year of rent, and the tuition for little Giulia's exclusive school. There are no job prospects for Francesca, so Francesca and Cesare decide to hold a raffle in which the prize will be Francesca. The raffle will be limited to twenty participants, who will each pay 100 million lire. The winner will have the right to live with Francesca for four years and can ask for whatever he wants. Raffle ticket buyers include friends of the late husband and Cesare himself. 

One day, Francesca runs over a young man, Antonio, with whom she begins a love affair. He seems to know about the raffle and, despite proclaiming his amorous passion, he would be willing for her to be enjoyed by the winner, continuing his secret meetings with her. In reality, the penniless young man aims over time to benefit from the raffle money.

A few days before the raffle drawing, however, the prosecutor receives a complaint about the raffle and the lawyer. The lawyer's office is searched, and a scandal threatens that could disturb local society. When questioned by the police, Francesca does not deny the story of the raffle, but says that the prize is actually the boat purchased by Cesare and the friends have mobilized to help her and the child. To avoid a scandal, the commissioner accepts this story, after which Francesca takes a plane and leaves forever, living off the raffle money.

Cast
 Monica Bellucci as Francesca
 Giulio Scarpati as Antonio
 Massimo Ghini as Cesare
  as Enrico
 Sandra Collodel as Carla
 Christina Engelhardt as Barbara
 Tiziana Pini as Camilla
 Marino Masé
 Renato Scarpa
 Paolo De Vita
 Maurizio Sciarra as Lawyer Di Cillo (uncredited)

References

External links
 

1991 films
1991 comedy-drama films
1990s Italian films
1990s Italian-language films
Films directed by Francesco Laudadio
Films set in Apulia
Films shot in Apulia
Italian comedy-drama films